Test subject may refer to:

 Animal testing
 Human subject research

Product testers